The following is a list of churches in Purbeck, Dorset.

List 

 St James's Church, Kingston, Purbeck
 Lady St Mary Church, Wareham
 St Martin's Church, Wareham
 St Mary's Church, Swanage
 St Nicholas's Church, Kimmeridge
 St Nicholas' Church, Moreton

Purbeck
Purbeck
Purbeck District